Fulguropsis feldmanni is a species of sea snail, a marine gastropod mollusk in the family Busyconidae, the crown conches and their allies.

Description
The shell grows to a length of 57 mm.

Distribution
This species occurs in the Gulf of Mexico, off Yucatán, Mexico.

References

 Rosenberg, G., F. Moretzsohn, and E. F. García. 2009. Gastropoda (Mollusca) of the Gulf of Mexico, pp. 579–699 in Felder, D.L. and D.K. Camp (eds.), Gulf of Mexico–Origins, Waters, and Biota. Biodiversity. Texas A&M Press, College Station, Texas.

External links

Busyconidae
Gastropods described in 1991